KPXQ (1360 AM) is a Christian radio station owned by Salem Media Group in Phoenix, Arizona, United States.  Programs include Through the Bible with J. Vernon McGee, Grace to You with John MacArthur, and Love Worth Finding with Adrian Rogers. KPXQ is licensed to Glendale.

History
KPXQ signed on in 1947 as KRUX on 1340 kHz, licensed to Glendale.  KRUX moved to 1360 in 1957 after being denied a frequency change to 910 kHz ten years prior.  The station now has a 50kw signal.

The glory years
From the 1950s until the 1970s, KRUX was a major Top-40 station in Phoenix.  During its heyday, it competed head to head with KRIZ 1230 AM for Top 40 radio dominance in Phoenix. KRUX and KRIZ went back and forth in the ratings game before both stations succumbed to the more popular FM rockers of the 1970s.

On January 20, 1967, Monkees Davy Jones, Micky Dolenz and Mike Nesmith "took over" the KRUX studios (Peter Tork was ill that day), in order to promote their concert at the Arizona Veterans Memorial Coliseum the next day. Portions of this broadcast were used in the first season finale episode, "Monkees On Tour".

Program Directors during the station's heyday included Larry "Lucky Lawrence" Wright and Al McCoy, who went on to become the long-time play-by-play voice of the NBA Phoenix Suns.

Some of the station's all time ratings getters were the personalities of the 1960s, known as the "KRUX Good Guys": Lucky Lawrence, "Bobby-Poo" Bob Shannon,"Your Boy" Al McCoy, Charles L. "Kit" Carson, Norm Seeley, Dick Gray, Dennis Wilkerson, "Mighty" Ed Mitchell and Don Daro overnights. The jocks of the 1970s were John Driscoll aka the 2nd Bob Shannon, John Sebastian, Dave Trout, Chuck Browning, Harry Scarborough, Rhett Walker and Rich "Mother" Robbins.

Format changes and life after Top 40
For a brief period in the mid-1970s, KRUX experimented with an all-news format featuring NBC's ill-fated "News and Information Service" network. When that experiment failed, they went back to their Top 40 format, with Richard Ruiz of Downey California, as program director.  Ruiz pre-dated the switch to all-news in 1975. KRUX would never recover with the insurgence of FM competition. KRUX management (Lotus Corporation) brought in many valley vets from other stations to try to stem the tide of music on FM. Those radio personalities included "KC in the Morning" Kennedy from 5 AM to 10AM, Daniel (Oshe) from 10AM to 3 PM, Program Director Bobby Rivers 3PM to 7PM in the late seventies till January 1981, when the final rock and roll turntable (Cart machine) went silent. Other DJ's included Greg Mills from 7PM - midnight and Morgan Evans from midnight to 6am. Evans moved to morning drive at Anchorage, Alaska AOR rocker KRKN in 1981 after the KRUX format change to Big Band. CW MCMUffin on Weekends doubled also as the engineer for over five years.

In 1981, KRUX became KLFF with the "Music of Your Life" MOR format until 1992, when they tried another attempt at all-news (featuring the CNN Headline News audio feed) as KNNS.  This would last two years before they switched to sports talk as KGME, now at 910 AM. Howard Stern was on KGME and KHOT-FM early in 1995. In 1998, KGME upgraded its power from 5000 to 50,000 watts daytime, while remaining at 1000 watts at night.

In April 1999, AM/FM (now part of Clear Channel) purchased the call letters, studio, and programming of KGME, moving them to 550 kHz. In turn, co-owned KOY, which was the first radio station in Arizona and had been on 550 since 1941, moved to 1230 where it remains to this day. KGME and news/talk sister-station KFYI swapped frequencies in 2000, with sports on 910 and news/talk on 550.

New Planet Radio kept the 1360 transmitter, changing the call letters to KFDJ, and simulcasted co-owned KEDJ 106.3 until the AM station was sold to Salem.

Salem purchased the station in 1999, with intentions of creating a new conservative talk station in Phoenix to pair with its Christian Talk and Teaching format at 960 AM (which was then called "Q96"). Instead, Salem moved the religious programming to 1360 AM with 960 becoming the home for secular talk.

References

External links

FCC History Cards for KPXQ

PXQ
Salem Media Group properties
Radio stations established in 1947
1947 establishments in Arizona